Peter Tennant Johnstone (born 1948) is Professor of the Foundations of Mathematics at the University of Cambridge, and a fellow of St. John's College. 
He invented or developed a broad range of fundamental ideas in topos theory. His thesis, completed at the University of Cambridge in 1974, was entitled "Some Aspects of Internal Category Theory in an Elementary Topos".

He is a great-great nephew of the Reverend George Gilfillan who was eulogised in William McGonagall's first poem.

Books
. 
— "[F]ar too hard to read, and not for the faint-hearted"
.
.
 (v.3 in preparation)

References

External links
Johnstone's web page

Category theorists
Living people
Cambridge mathematicians
Fellows of St John's College, Cambridge
1948 births